María del Carmen Alva Prieto (born 24 February 1967) is a Peruvian lawyer and politician serving as the president of the Congress of the Republic of Peru since 26 July 2021 and a member of the Congress representing Lima. She is a member of Popular Action.

Early life 
Alva was born in Lima on 24 February 1967 and is a daughter , brother of a former congressman and historic leader of the Popular Action Javier Alva Orlandini. Her grandfather, José Felipe Alva y Alva was senator for Cajamarca.

She studied law at the University of Lima where she graduated as a lawyer. She obtained a master's degree in Public Management at the Government Institute of the University of San Martín de Porres.

Career 
She was a parliamentary coordinator and lawyer of the Legal Management of the Social Security Normalization Office. Additionally, she was a legal advisor at the Ministry of Labor and Promotion of Employment.

For the 2006 general elections, she was a member of the Government Plan Commission on public management issues for the presidential candidacy of Valentín Paniagua. In those elections, Alva began her political career running for the Congress of the Republic for the Frente de Centro. However, she was not elected.

In the 2010 Lima municipal elections, she was elected councilor of Santa María del Mar for Popular Action. And also deputy mayor, during the administration of Viviana Roda Scheuch, for the municipal period 2010-2014.

In the 2020 parliamentary elections, she tried again to run for Congress for Popular Action, but was not elected again.

In the 2021 general elections, Alva was elected congresswoman of the republic for Acción Popular, with 25,219 votes, for the 2021-2026 parliamentary term. On July 26, 2021, Alva was elected president of the Congress of the Republic for the 2021-2022 legislative period.

As a congresswoman, she defended bills perceived as unfavourable to workers, including the extension of the workday, provisions facilitating layoffs, or the rejection of social security projects. She fought against President Pedro Castillo, seeking his impeachment.

Controversies 
Alva caused controversy by verbally and physically assaulting Congresswoman Isabel Cortez of Juntos por el Perú during a session in parliament on 11 August 2022. Cortez, a former city cleaner of indigenous descent, had moved from her seat during a discussion among some parliamentarians following statements made by Norma Yarrow of the far-right Renovación Popular party (an ally of Alva's party, Acción Popular) accusing the Castillo government of "selling itself for a plate of lentils", which caused an outcry and uproar among parliamentarians. Cortez approached the seat where Alva's colleague Wilson Soto was sitting, with several congressmen also around him. When she came face to face with Alva, after a dialogue, the latter violently pulled and squeezed Cortez's arm and threatened her. After receiving strong condemnation for the incident, Alva had to apologise for her "inappropriate reaction", while the Cambio Democrático (Juntos por el Perú) party called for her to be sanctioned.

On the same day, it was also revealed that Alva had racistly insulted Congressman Ilich López by calling him a "fucking Indian". The insult was due to Alva's failure to be elected President of Foreign Relations. In addition, López stated that Alva "[said] that he was going to destroy us and our families, that we were going to shed tears of blood", in reference to a group of parliamentarians from the Acción Popular party who were meeting secretly with President Castillo. López also revealed that Alva was very upset at the meeting that took place for the vote, banging on the door of the room and swearing.

Private life 
She is married and has three sons.

References

External links 
 

1967 births
Living people
Politicians from Lima
University of Lima alumni
Popular Action (Peru) politicians
Presidents of the Congress of the Republic of Peru
Peruvian anti-communists
Peruvian people of Italian descent
Peruvian people of Spanish descent
Peruvian people of Basque descent
Peruvian people of English descent
Peruvian people of Mestizo descent
Peruvian people of Portuguese descent
21st-century Peruvian politicians
21st-century Peruvian women politicians
Women members of the Congress of the Republic of Peru